William Arderon (1703– 25 November 1767) was an English naturalist.

Life
Arderon moved from Yorkshire to Norwich as an excise officer. There influential contacts for him the post of managing clerk at the New Mills. He became close to Henry Baker to whose works on the microscope he contributed.

Arderon was elected a Fellow of the Royal Society in 1745, and was later regarded as the founder of a school of naturalists and men of science in Norwich. He died 25 November 1767, and was buried in Heigham churchyard, near Norwich.

Works
Arderon made numerous contributions to the Philosophical Transactions. He also left manuscripts on subjects connected with natural history and microscopy, journals, and correspondence with Henry Baker.

Notes

Attribution

1703 births
1767 deaths
English naturalists
Fellows of the Royal Society